The second season of the television series Dallas aired on CBS during the 1978–79 TV season.

Cast

Starring
In alphabetical order:
 Barbara Bel Geddes as Miss Ellie Ewing (24 episodes)
 Jim Davis as Jock Ewing (24 episodes)
 Patrick Duffy as Bobby Ewing (24 episodes)
 Linda Gray as Sue Ellen Ewing (24 episodes)
 Larry Hagman as J.R. Ewing (24 episodes)
 Steve Kanaly as Ray Krebbs (14 episodes)
 Victoria Principal as Pamela Barnes Ewing (24 episodes)
 Charlene Tilton as Lucy Ewing (24 episodes)

Also starring
 Ken Kercheval as Cliff Barnes (14 episodes)
 Tina Louise as Julie Grey (2 episodes), billed under "Guest Star" status in her first appearance

Special guest stars
 David Wayne as Willard "Digger" Barnes (2 episodes)
 John McIntire as Sam Culver (1 episode)

Notable guest stars
Several long running Dallas cast members debut during the second season. Most notably Susan Howard, who became a series regular in Season 5, made her first appearance as Donna Culver. Additionally, Don Starr (Jordan Lee), Fern Fitzgerald (Marielee Stone), Paul Sorensen (Andy Bradley), Robert Ackerman (Wade Luce), Sherril Lynn Rettino (Jackie Dugan), Barbara Babcock (Liz Craig), James Brown (Harry McSween), Karlene Crockett (Muriel Gillis), John Zaremba (Dr. Harlen Danvers), and Meg Gallagher (Louella Caraway Lee) all appeared for the first time. Also, after being played by Donna Bullock in Season 1, and briefly by Ann Ford and Nancy Bleier in Season 2, Jeanna Michaels finally joined the cast as Connie Brasher, Bobby's secretary, during Season 2, thus becoming the final and longest lasting actress in the role, playing her until Season 4.

David Ackroyd and Joan Van Ark appeared as Lucy's parents Gary and Valene Ewing. In 1979, both characters returned in their own series, Dallas spinoff Knots Landing, with Ted Shackelford replacing Ackroyd, and continued to appear in Dallas until the mid 1980s. Both characters returned for the series finale "Conundrum" in 1991. Colleen Camp appeared as Kristin Shepard, a character recast by Mary Crosby the following year, receiving an "also starring" billing. Morgan Fairchild appeared as the first of three actresses to play Jenna Wade, with Jenna later portrayed by Francine Tacker in Season 3, and by series regular Priscilla Presley from Seasons 7–11. Laurie Lynn Myers appeared as Jenna's daughter Charlie, later portrayed by Shalane McCall from Seasons 7–11. Martha Scott appeared in one episode as Patricia Shepard, but returned for recurring episodes during seasons 3 and 9.

Crew
Series creator David Jacobs writes the first two episodes of the season, introducing the characters of Gary and Valene, and continues as creative consultant until halfway through the season, when he left Dallas to create Knots Landing. Producer Leonard Katzman writes and direct his first episodes, and replaces Jacobs as showrunner, remaining on the show until its closure in 1991.

Additional writers include the returning Camille Marchetta and Arthur Bernard Lewis, as well as newcomers  Darlene Craviotto, Jim Inman, Worley Thorne, Rena Down, D. C. Fontana and Richard Fontana. Lee Rich and Philip Capice continue to serve as executive producers. Katzman serves as producer, and Cliff Fenneman as associate producer. Arthur Bernard Lewis was promoted executive story editor, with Camille Marchetta serving as story editor.

DVD release
The second season was released, alongside season one, by Warner Home Video on a Region 1 DVD box set on August 24, 2004. The box includes five double-sided DVDs, and, alongside the two seasons' 29 episodes, it also include a SOAPnet’s Soap Talk Dallas reunion featurette, and three commentary tracks, by actors Larry Hagman and Charlene Tilton, and series creator David Jacobs.

Nielsen ratings
1) "Reunion (Part 1)" 
September 23, 1978 – #56 (N/A) 
2) "Reunion (Part 2)" 
September 30, 1978 – #59 (N/A) 
3) "Old Acquaintances" 
October 7, 1978 – #58 (12.9/22) 
4) "Bypass" 
October 14, 1978 – #52 (N/A) 
5) "Black Market Baby" 
October 15, 1978 – #42 (N/A) 
6) "Double Wedding" 
October 21, 1978 – #48 (N/A) 
7) "Runaway" 
October 28, 1978 – #35 (–/30) 
8) "Election" 
November 5, 1978 – #48 (N/A) 
9) "Survival" 
November 12, 1978 – #18 (21/38) 
10) "Act of Love" 
November 19, 1978 – #41 (N/A) 
11) "Triangle" 
November 26, 1978 – #39 (N/A) 
12) "Fallen Idol" 
December 3, 1978 – #23 (N/A) 
13) "Kidnapped" 
December 17, 1978 – #18 (N/A)
14) "Home Again" 
January 7, 1979 – #11 (25.7/39) 
15) "For Love or Money" 
January 14, 1979 – #33 (N/A)
16) "Julie's Return" 
January 26, 1979 – #32 (N/A) 
17) "The Red File (Part 1)"
February 2, 1979 – #30 (N/A) 
18) "The Red File (Part 2)" 
February 9, 1979 – #18 (N/A) 
19) "Sue Ellen's Sister" 
February 16, 1979 – #23 (N/A) 
20) "Call Girl" 
February 23, 1979 – #37 (N/A) 
21) "Royal Marriage" 
March 9, 1979 – #20 (N/A) 
22) "The Outsiders" 
March 16, 1979 – #28 (N/A) 
23) "John Ewing, III (Part 1)" 
March 23, 1979 – #14 (N/A) 
24) "John Ewing, III (Part 2)" 
March 30, 1979 – #11 (N/A)

Episodes

References

External links
 List of Dallas season 2 episodes at the Internet Movie Database

1978 American television seasons
1979 American television seasons
Dallas (1978 TV series) seasons